Various fossil primates have been found in South America and adjacent regions such as Panama and the Caribbean. Presently, 78 species of New World monkeys have been registered in South America. Around the middle of the Cenozoic, approximately 34 million years ago, two types of mammals appeared for the first time in South America: rodents and primates. Both of these groups had already been inhabiting other continents for millions of years and they simply arrived in South America rather than originated there. Analyses of evolutionary relationships have shown that their closest relatives were living in Africa at the time. Therefore, the most likely explanation is that they somehow crossed the Atlantic Ocean, which was less wide than today, landed in South America, and founded new populations of rodents and primates.

The first South American primates gave rise to an impressive evolutionary radiation: more than 120 species in five families. These primates are known as platyrrhine (flat-nosed) primates and are closely related to Old World apes and monkeys (catarrhine primates). Platyrrhines include some of the most popular and acrobatic monkeys such as spider monkeys (Ateles) and capuchins (Cebus), both of which have grasping (prehensile) tails that can be used as a fifth limb. Platyrrhines also include a wide variety of colorful tamarins and marmosets (family Callitrichidae). The platyrrhine primate fossil record is relatively sparse, quite unlike that of caviomorph rodents.

The presently oldest New World monkey is Perupithecus ucayaliensis from Amazonian Peru, described in 2015. A 2017 study of the fossils estimated the body mass for the various fossil primate species. However, the Ucayalipithecus who might have rafted across the Atlantic between ~35–32 million years ago, are nested within the Parapithecoidea from the Eocene of Afro-Arabia.



List of fossil primates of South America 
Note: some authors, among others Fossilworks, consider Killikaike synonymous with Homunculus and Szalatavus with Branisella, while other researchers consider the genera as different.The Panamanian and Caribbean fossil primates have been included for completeness.

See also 

 Evolution of primates
 List of fossil primates
 List of prehistoric mammals
 List of New World monkey species
 List of primates of Central America
 List of primates of Colombia
 List of primates of Peru
 List of gomphothere fossils in South America

References

Bibliography

General

Specific

Further reading 
 
 
 

†Primates
Primates
†South America
†List
†List